Oszczepalin Drugi  is a village in the administrative district of Gmina Wojcieszków, within Łuków County, Lublin Voivodeship, in eastern Poland.

The village has a population of 420.

References

Oszczepalin Drugi